The 210th Coastal Division was an infantry division of the Royal Italian Army during World War II. Royal Italian Army coastal divisions were second line divisions formed with reservists and equipped with second rate materiel. They were often commanded by officers called out of retirement.

History 
The division was activated on 1 March 1943 in Bari by expanding the X Coastal Brigade. The division was assigned to IX Army Corps and had its headquarter in Monteroni. The division was responsible for the coastal defense of the coast of the Salento peninsula to the south of the towns of Taranto and Brindisi. The defense of the two towns and their surrounding area was the responsibility of the Royal Italian Navy's Maritime Military Base Taranto respectively Maritime Military Base Brindisi.

After the Armistice of Cassibile was announced on 8 September 1943 the division together with the 58th Infantry Division "Legnano", 152nd Infantry Division "Piceno" and XXXI Coastal Brigade immediately established a defensive line beginning in Taranto and running through Grottaglie, Francavilla Fontana, and Latiano to Brindisi, behind which on 9 September the British 1st Airborne Division landed. The division surrendered on 10 September to the British 1st Airborne Division and on 13 September the Allies reactivated the division, which joined the Italian Co-belligerent Army. For the rest of the Italian campaign the division performed rear area security and work duties as 210th Division for the American Fifth Army. The division was disbanded in autumn 1945.

Organization 
 210th Coastal Division, in Monteroni
 113th Coastal Regiment
 4x Coastal battalions
 114th Coastal Regiment
 3x Coastal battalions
 164th Coastal Regiment
 3x Coastal battalions
 XIV Dismounted Squadrons Group/ Regiment "Cavalleggeri Guide"
 VII Coastal Artillery Training Group
 LIV Coastal Artillery Group
 CCLVI Coastal Artillery Group
 3rd Company/ CLII Static Machine Gun Battalion
 4th Machine Gun Company
 18th Anti-tank Company (47/32 anti-tank guns; transferred from the 18th Infantry Division "Messina")
 408th Mortar Company (81mm Mod. 35 mortars)
 34th Telephone Operators Company
 210th Telegraph and Radio Operators Company
 210th Mixed Engineer Company
 241st Anti-paratroopers Unit
 243rd Anti-paratroopers Unit
 210th Carabinieri Section
 179th Field Post Office
 Division Services

Attached to the division:
 16th Guardia alla Frontiera Artillery Regiment
 3x Artillery groups

Commanding officers 
The division's commanding officers were:

 Generale di Brigata Raffaele Colonna (1 March 1943 - ?)

References 

 
 

Coastal divisions of Italy
Infantry divisions of Italy in World War II